Collaborative innovation is a process in which multiple players contribute towards creating new products with customers and suppliers.

Collaboration can occur in all aspects of the business cycle, depending on the context:
 Procurement and supplier collaboration
 Research and development of new products, services and technologies
 Marketing, distribution and commercialization

Collaborative innovation network (CoIN) is a type of collaborative innovation practice that makes use of the internet platforms such as email, chat, social networks, blogs, and Wikis to promote communication and innovation within self-organizing virtual teams. The difference is that people that collaborate in CoIN are so intrinsically motivated that might not be paid nor get any advantage.

Thus, a CoIN is a social construct with a huge potential for innovation. It has been defined by the originator of the term, Peter Gloor from MIT Sloan's Center for Collective Intelligence, as "a cyberteam of self-motivated people with a collective vision, enabled by the Web to collaborate in achieving a common goal by sharing ideas, information, and work".

Indeed, CoIN is a type of open collaboration that helps organizations to become more creative, productive and efficient. By adopting CoIN as part of their culture, these companies accelerate innovation, uncover hidden business opportunities, reduce costs and enhance synergies. They not only can engage employees from every level of hierarchy towards a common project (discovering new talents and promoting direct relation between employees) but also partner with external parties.

Similar is the concept of the "Self-Organizing Innovation Network", it has been described by author, Robert Rycroft of the Elliott School of International Affairs of George Washington University.

Overview
CoINs feature internal transparency and direct communication. Members of a CoIN collaborate and share knowledge directly with each other, rather than through hierarchies. They come together with a shared vision because they are intrinsically motivated to do so and seek to collaborate in some way to advance an idea.

CoINs work across hierarchies and boundaries in which members can directly and openly exchange ideas and information. This collaborative and transparent environment fosters innovation. Gloor describes phenomenon as "swarm creativity". According to him, "CoINs are the best engines to drive innovation".

CoINs existed well before the advent of modern communication technology. However, internet and instant communication improved productivity and enabled the reach of a global scale. Today, they rely on Internet, e-mail, and other communications vehicles for information sharing.

According to Peter Gloor, CoINs have 5 main characteristics:
 Dispersed Membership: technology allows members to be spread over the world. Regardless of the location, members share a common goal and are convinced of their common cause.
 Interdependent Membership: cooperation between members is key to achieve common goal. The work of one member is affected and interdependent on the others' work.
 No simple chain of command: there is no superior command. It is a decentralized and self-organized system. Conflicts are solved without the need of a hierarchy or authority.
 Work towards a common goal: members are willing to contribute, work and share freely. They are intrinsically motivated to donate their work, create and share knowledge in favor of a common goal.
 Dependence on trust: cooperative behavior and mutual trust is needed to work efficiently within the network. Members act accordingly to an ethical code that states the rules and principles to be followed by all members. Usually, ethical codes include principles related to respect, consistency, reciprocity and rationality.

There also are five essential elements of collaborative innovation networks (what Gloor calls as "genetic code"):

1. They are learning networks: they set an informal and flexible environment which facilitates and stimulates collaboration and the exchange of ideas, information and knowledge.

2. They need an ethical code: they agree on an ethical code that guides the conduct and behavior of the members.

3. They are based on trust and self-organization: members trust each other without the need of a centralized management. They are brought together by mutual respect and strong sense of shared beliefs.

4. They make knowledge accessible to everyone: CoINs nurture communication to an extent that information shared with everyone. Nowadays, with internet and social medias, their ideas and concepts achieve a global level.

5. They operate in internal honesty and transparency: they create a system based on reciprocal trust and mutually established principles.

Examples 
CoINs have been developing many disruptive innovations such as the Internet, Linux, the Web and Wikipedia. These inventions were created in universities or labs by a group of students with little or no budget. They were not focused on the money but on the sense of accomplishment.

The Web is the early version of Internet. It was driven by a CoIN of intrinsically motivated people that wanted to improve technical development and launch a disruptive solution. Their goal was to link mainframes and allow multiple users simultaneously.

Another contribution was Linux, an operating system for personal computing that directly competes with Microsoft. It was initially developed by a student called Linus Torvalds and later became an open source software. The code is publicly available and anyone can contribute or enhance it. The success of Linux is the constant and continuous updating which is done at a much lower cost than closed source software.

Wikipedia gathers thousands of volunteers that constantly write and update content. Although it does not have a hierarchy nor a central authority, the entries are mostly accurate and complete. Volunteers share a strong feeling of community and willingness to contribute towards knowledge without being paid for it.

Faced with these creations, large companies such as IBM and Intel have learnt to use the principles of open innovation to enhance their research learning curve. They increased or established collaborations with universities, agencies and small companies to accelerate their processes and launch new services faster.

Collaborative innovation network factors

Asheim and Isaksen (2002) conclude that innovative network contribute to the achievement of optimal allocation of resources, and promoting knowledge transfer performance. However, there are four factors of collaborative innovation network that differently affect the performance of CoINs. Those factors are:

1. network size: network size is the number of partners such as enterprises, universities, research institutions, intermediaries, and government departments in an innovative network.
Previous work reveals that network size has a positive effect on knowledge transfer as it provide the actor (e.g. firm) with two major substantive benefits: one is the exposure to a larger amount of external information, knowledge, and ideas and the other is resource sharing between the actor and its contacts such as knowledge sharing, reduction of transaction costs, complementarities, and scale.

2. network heterogeneity: network heterogeneity refers to differences in the knowledge, technology, ability, and size of members in the network. Firms in a more heterogeneous network have a higher probability to acquire external knowledge resources. When network heterogeneity is higher, getting complementary resources and accelerating the speed of knowledge transfer are easier.

3. network tie-strength: Tie-Strength refers to the nature of a relational contact and includes the degree of intimacy, duration, and frequency; the breadth of topic usually refers to time length, tie depth, emotional intensity, intimacy frequency, and interactive connection. A collaborative innovative network with a high level of tie-strength can provide firms with effective information and knowledge, reduce risk and uncertainty in the innovation process, and achieve successful knowledge transfer.

4. network centrality: Network centrality refers to an actor's position in a network. Actors centrally located in a network are in an advantageous position to monitor the flow of information and have the consequent advantage of having large numbers of contacts who are willing and able to provide them with important opportunities and resources.

Current challenges
Collaborative innovation still needs to be empowered. A more collaborative approach involving stakeholders such as governments, corporations, entrepreneurs and scholars is key to tackling the main challenges facing today.

First of all, it is still important to raise awareness of CoIN and its benefits among companies and major economic fields. Policy makers and corporate leaders could support the development of programs, strategies and educational plans to stimulate CoINs in specific sectors, benefiting the whole economy.

Second, the overall legal and regulatory framework still needs to evolve to foster cross-firm collaboration. Fiscal and intellectual property regimes should be reviewed to provide the necessary infrastructure to nourish CoINs. A further stimulus is important to encourage the creation of start-ups and the development of a network of partners across companies.

Finally, financial aid should be granted to support collaborative projects related to technology, research and innovation. CoINs have an enormous potential to deliver innovation and drive significant gains in competitiveness. However, they need resources in order to fully operate and reach their maximum potential.

Future 
As CoINs become increasingly popular among governments and corporations, the ethical, financial, economic, and cognitive issues which drive incentives will inevitably face challenges. Over time potential innovators may be unwilling to participate in projects merely on the basis of implied financial gain. As globalization begins to impact traditional models of planned social progress, the broader political context in which participants cooperate has become more relevant lately. This suggests an increased need for independent parties to collaborate on the basis of agreed upon principles and objectives, ultimately this could encompass the interests of humanity and the emergence of a global culture.

See also 

 General theory of collaboration: Collective intelligence • Polytely • Swarm intelligence
 Open politics • Symbolic interactionism
 Commons-based peer production
 Community of practice

References

Further reading 
 Peter Gloor (2005) Swarm Creativity: Competitive Advantage Through Collaborative Innovation Networks. 
 Peter Gloor and Scott Cooper (2007) Coolhunting: Chasing Down the Next Big Thing. 
 Silvestre, B. S., Dalcol, P. R. T. (2009) Geographical proximity and innovation: Evidences from the Campos Basin oil & gas industrial agglomeration — Brazil. Technovation, Vol. 29 (8), pp. 546–561.
 Gillett, A.G. and Smith, G., 2015. Creativities, innovation, and networks in garage punk rock: A case study of the Eruptörs. Artivate: A Journal of Entrepreneurship in the Arts, pp. 9–24. artivate.hida.asu.edu/index.php/artivate/article/download/82/36

External links 
fido ('fearless innovation designed online') - collaborative innovation system
Ethical Issues in Collaborative Innovation Networks by Peter A. Gloor, Carey Heckman, & Fillia Makedon.
"Advances in Interdisciplinary Studies of Work Teams"
"Transforming Government Through Collaborative Innovation"
"The Future of Work"
"Global University System with Globally Collaborative Innovation Network"
"Network Plasticity and Collaborative Innovation"
"Performance Based Integrated Innovation Management System" proposal

Social networks
Knowledge engineering
Semantic Web
Social information processing
Collaborative projects
Human-based computation